The Essence of Christianity (historical orthography: Das Weſen des Chriſtenthums) is a book by Ludwig Feuerbach first published in 1841. It explains Feuerbach's philosophy and critique of religion.

Influence 

The book is often considered a classic of humanism and the author's magnum opus. Karl Marx and Friedrich Engels were strongly influenced by the book, although they criticised Feuerbach for his inconsistent espousal of materialism. Feuerbach's theory of alienation would later be used by Marx in his theory of alienation. Max Stirner directed his The Ego and Its Own against it. Rather than simply a polemic, Stirner's work uses Feuerbach's idea of God as a human abstraction as the basis of his critique of Feuerbach.

In the consciousness of the infinite 

Feuerbach's theme was a derivation of Hegel's speculative theology in which the Creation remains a part of the Creator, while the Creator remains greater than the Creation. When the student Feuerbach presented his own theory to professor Hegel, Hegel refused to reply positively to it.

In Part I of his book, Feuerbach developed what he calls the "true or anthropological essence of religion", treating of God in his various aspects "as a being of the understanding," "as a moral being or law," "as love" and so on. Feuerbach talks of how man is equally a conscious being, more so than God because man has placed upon God the ability of understanding. Man contemplates many things and in doing so he becomes acquainted with himself. Feuerbach shows that in every aspect God corresponds to some feature or need of human nature. "If man is to find contentment in God", he writes, "he must find himself in God."

Thus God is nothing else than man: he is, so to speak, the outward projection of man's inward nature. This projection is dubbed as a chimera by Feuerbach, that God and the idea of a higher being is dependent upon the aspect of benevolence. Feuerbach states that "a God who is not benevolent, not just, not wise, is no God," and he then says that qualities are not suddenly denoted as divine because of their godly association. The qualities themselves are divine therefore making God divine, indicating that man is capable of understanding and applying meanings of divinity to religion and not that religion makes a man divine.

The force of this attraction to religion though, giving divinity to a figure like God, is explained by Feuerbach as God is a being that acts throughout man in all forms. God, "is the principle of [man's] salvation, of [man's] good dispositions and actions, consequently [man's] own good principle and nature." It appeals to man to give qualities to the idol of their religion because without these qualities a figure such as God would become merely an object, its importance would become obsolete, there would no longer be a feeling of an existence for God. Therefore, Feuerbach contends, when man removes all qualities from God, "God is no longer anything more to him than a negative being." Additionally, because man is imaginative, God is given traits and there holds the appeal. God is a part of man through the invention of a God. Equally though, man is repulsed by God, because "God alone is the being who acts of himself."

In part 2 he discusses the "false or theological essence of religion," i.e. the view which regards God as having a separate existence over against man. Hence arise various mistaken beliefs, such as the belief in revelation which he believes not only injures the moral sense, but also "poisons, nay destroys, the divinest feeling in man, the sense of truth," and the belief in sacraments such as the Lord's Supper, which is to him a piece of religious materialism of which "the necessary consequences are superstition and immorality."

A caustic criticism of Feuerbach was delivered in 1844 by Max Stirner. In his book Der Einzige und sein Eigentum (The Ego and Its Own) he attacked Feuerbach as inconsistent in his atheism. (See External links)

Editions 

German
 (1841) First. Das Wesen des Christenthums. Leipzig: Otto Wigand.
 (1843) Second. Das Wesen des Christenthums. Leipzig: Otto Wigand.
 (1848) Second. Das Wesen des Christenthums. Leipzig: Otto Wigand. Google (NYPL)
 (1849) Third. Ludwig Feuerbach's sämmtliche Werke. Volume 7. Leipzig: Otto Wigand. Google (Oxford)
 (1883) Fourth. Das Wesen des Christentums. Leipzig: Otto Wigand.

English (translated by Mary Ann Evans, as "George Eliot")
 (1854) First. The Essence of Christianity. London: John Chapman. IA (St. Mary's)
 (1881) Second. The Essence of Christianity. London: Trübner & Co. Google (Oxford)
 (1893) Third. The Essence of Christianity. London: Kegan Paul, Trench, Trübner & Co.;  New York:  Harper & Row (Harper Torchbooks), 1957.

French (translated by Joseph Roy)
 (1864) Essence du Christianisme. Paris: Librairie Internationale. Google (Ghent)

See also 

Ludwig Andreas Feuerbach
Marx's theory of alienation

References

External links
 The Essence of Christianity (New York: C. Blanchard, 1855) online book
 Das Wesen des Christentums at Zeno.org. (German)
 
 Ludwig Feuerbach: "The Essence Of Christianity" in Relation to (Max Stirner's) "The Ego And Its Own"
 English Text Of "The Essence Of Christianity" at Gutenberg.org
 

1841 non-fiction books
Books critical of Christianity
Philosophy books
Philosophy of religion literature
Religious studies books
Humanism